The , also sometimes called YIFFF, is held in a resort-like environment in the small town of Yūbari on the northernmost Japanese island of Hokkaidō. From 1990 to 1999, the festival was known as the Yubari International Fantastic Adventure Film Festival.

History
In 1990, the last coal mine in the Hokkaidō mining town of Yūbari having closed, the city leaders were looking for a way to revitalize the local economy. This was the beginning of the Yubari International Fantastic Film Festival. The festival was divided into two main programs, a prestigious international competition for young directors, and an Off Theatre program for mostly Japanese amateur, independent and first-time directors. The first year in 1990 had as a special guest, actor Jon Voight and his daughter, a young starlet named Angelina Jolie. In 1993, Quentin Tarantino was at the festival and wrote part of the screenplay for Pulp Fiction in his hotel room. Some years later, he paid homage to the town in the name of a character in Kill Bill: Volume 1, "Gogo Yubari". In 1996 the festival also had special guest stars, comedians Steve Martin and Martin Short. In 2004 the festival drew a record audience of 27,000.

The festival had always been sponsored financially by the city of Yubari but the town filed for bankruptcy in 2007 and that year's festival had to be cancelled. However, the people of Yubari with the assistance of a number of sponsors were able to group together to revive the festival in 2008. The international competition section of the festival had to be dropped but the Off Theatre program for young Japanese directors was retained with the Grand Prize bringing 2 million yen (about $20,000) to the winner. The new Governor's Award was presented by the Governor of Hokkaidō. In addition to the competition section, the festival continued to screen a number of international films by promising directors. One of the sponsors for the festival is the giant Japanese satellite broadcasting company SKYPerfecTV! which has also broadcast parts of the program. The scaled down 2008 festival drew more than 8,800 fans and attendance increased to over 10,500 in 2009.

The 32nd edition of the Yubari International Fantastic Film Festival will be held from July 28 to August 1 2022.

Major awards
Award information from:

1990 Awards
Held February 14–18, 1990.
 Grand Prize
Ofelas – Director: Nils Gaup
 Special Prize
Spirits of the Air, Gremlins of the Clouds – Director: Alex Proyas

OFF THEATRE COMPETITION
 Grand Prize
Takeshita Performance Higei Mito-Komon – Director: Sinya Takesita
 Special Prize
Gig – Director: Kosuke Ienaga
 Toroma Prize
Meilin Adventure – Director: Satoshi Imai

1991 Awards
Held February 15–19, 1991.
 Grand Prize
The Miracle in Valby (Miraklet i Valby) – Director: Åke Sandgren
 Special Jury Prize
Windwalker – Director: Kieth Merrill
 Critic's Award
Miller's Crossing – Director: Joel Coen

OFF THEATRE COMPETITION
 Grand Prize
Death Express – Director: Hiroyuki Terada
 Jury Prize
Rice Game – Director: Hideaki Kobayashi

1992 Awards
Held February 14–18, 1992.
 Grand Prize
The Swordsman in Double Flag Town – Director: He Ping
 Special Jury Prize
 – Director: 
 Critic's Award
Tetsuo II: Body Hammer – Director: Shinya Tsukamoto

OFF THEATRE COMPETITION
 Grand Prize
Diamonds Moon – Director: Akira Nobi
 Jury Prize
Kappas – Director: Katsuya Ohsawa

1993 Awards
Held February 19–23, 1993.
 Grand Prize
Children of Nature – Director: Fridrik Thor Fridriksson
 Special Jury Prize
Winds of God – Director: Yoko Narahashi
 Critic's Award
Reservoir Dogs – Director: Quentin Tarantino
 Citizen's Award
Ninja Scroll – Director: Yoshiaki Kawajiri

OFF THEATRE COMPETITION
 Grand Prize
Trash – Director: Naoki Kubo
 Jury Prize
My Daddy Long Legs – Director: Shin Yasuhara

1994 Awards
Held February 18–22, 1994.
 Grand Prize
Killing Zoe – Director: Roger Roberts Avary
 Special Jury Prize
C'est arrive pres de chez vous – Director: Rémy Belvaux & André Bonzel
 Minami Toshiko Award / Critic's Award
Carne – Director: Gaspar Noé
 The Most Entertaining Award
El Mariachi – Director: Robert Rodriguez

OFF THEATRE COMPETITION
 Grand Prize
Family Time – Director: Ryota Kawaguchi
 Jury Prize
My Favorite "Skyline" – Director: Shin Yasuhara
Vending Machine and a Girl – Director: Kiyohide Otani

1995 Awards
Held February 17–21, 1995.
 Grand Prize
Tombés du ciel – Director: Philippe Lioret
 Special Jury Prize
The Secret Adventures of Tom Thumb – Director: Dave Borthwick
 Minami Toshiko Award
Wizard of Darkness – Director: Shimako Sato

OFF THEATRE COMPETITION
 Grand Prize
The Incredible Haniwa Man – Director: Shin Yasuhara
 Jury Prize
Anatomia Extinction – Director: Yoshihiro Nishimura
A Room Without Wind – Director: Ryuta Miyake

1996 Awards
Held February 18–20, 1996.
 Grand Prize
Accumulator 1 – Director: Jan Svěrák
 Special Jury Prize
Manneken Pis – Director: Frank Van Passel
 Minami Toshiko Award
Secret Waltz – Director: Akira Nobi

OFF THEATRE COMPETITION
 Grand Prize
Brain Holiday – Director: Hineki Mito
 Jury Prize
Blood Red Girls – Director: Daisuke Yamanouchi
 Encouragement Prize
Rest Room – Director: Muneyoshi Murakami
To Be or Not to Be – Director: Tomoko Matsunashi

1997 Awards
Held February 14–18, 1997.
 Grand Prize
Closing Time – Director: Masahiro Kobayashi
 Special Jury Prize
Little Sister – Director: Robert Jan Westdijk
 Minami Toshiko Award
Drive – Director: Steve Wang

OFF THEATRE COMPETITION
 Grand Prize
Party – Director: Mayumi Uchiumi
 Jury Prize
L&D – Director: Hideki Kimura

1998 Awards
Held February 13–17, 1998.
 Grand Prize
Bernie – Director: Albert Dupontel
 Jean-Hugues Anglade Award
Detective Riko – Director: Satoshi Isaka
 Adventure Film Prize
The Ground – Director: Atsushi Muroga
 Minami Toshiko Award
Illtown – Director: Nick Gomez

OFF THEATRE COMPETITION
 Grand Prize
Midnight Three – Director: Yasushi Koshizaka
 Special Jury Prize
Variation for Movements – Director: Yoshinao Sato
 Encouragement Prize
Kurushime Girl – Director: Noboru Iguchi

1999 Awards
Held February 19–23, 1999.
 Grand Prize
Bandits – Director: Katja von Garnier
 Special Jury Prize / Minami Toshiko Award
Moonlight Whispers – Director: Akihiko Shiota

OFF THEATRE COMPETITION
 Grand Prize
Tel-Club – Director: Kenji Murakami
 Special Jury Prize
Kiadoryoku REAL – Director: Katsushi Boda

2000 Awards
Held February 18–22, 2000.
 Grand Prize
Across a Gold Prairie – Director: Isshin Inudou
 Special Jury Prize
Pups – Director: Ash
 Minami Toshiko Award
Jin-Roh – Director: Hiroyuki Okiura

OFF THEATRE COMPETITION
 Grand Prize
Hazy Life – Director: Nobuhiro Yamashita
 Special Jury Prize
Let's Go Strawberry Girl – Director: Shinobu Kuribayashi

2001 Awards
Held February 15–19, 2001.
 Grand Prize
New Year's Day – Director: Suri Krishnamma
 Special Jury Prize
Animals – Director: Michael Di Jiacomo 
 Minami Toshiko Award
Siam Sunset – Director: John Polson

OFF THEATRE COMPETITION
 Grand Prize
Tokyo A Go Go – Director: Ryuichi Honda
 Special Jury Prize
L'Ilya – Director: Tomoya Sato

2002 Awards
Held February 14–18, 2002.
 Grand Prize
My Sassy Girl – Director: Kwak Jae-yong

OFF THEATRE COMPETITION
 Grand Prize
Run! Yamazaki! Run! – Director: Naoko Johnori
 Special Jury Prize
Nuts – Director: Yoko Chukira / Tomokazu / Shu Kageyama

2003 Awards
Held February 13–17, 2003.
 Grand Prize
Battlefield Baseball (Jigoku Koushien) – Director: Yūdai Yamaguchi

OFF THEATRE COMPETITION
 Grand Prize
Bijo-can – Director: Masaya Kakei
 Special Jury Prize
Ski Jumping Pairs – Director: Riichiro Mashima

2004 Awards
Held February 19–23, 2004.
 Grand Prize
Mokpo, Gangster's Paradise – Director: Kim Ji-hoon
 Special Jury Prize
Robot Stories – Director: Greg Pak
 Minami Toshiko Award
Better Than Sex – Director: Su Chao-pin & Lee Feng-bor

OFF THEATRE COMPETITION
 Grand Prize
The Far East Apartment – Director: Tetsuya Mariko 
 Special Jury Prize
Utsu-musume SAYURI – Director: Takashi Kimura

2005 Awards
Held February 24–28, 2005.
 Grand Prize
My Mother, the Mermaid – Director: Park Heung-sik
 Special Jury Prize
Innocence – Director: Lucile Hadžihalilović
 Minami Toshiko Award
The Neighbor No. Thirteen – Director: Yasuo Inoue

OFF THEATRE COMPETITION
 Grand Prize
Mariko's 30 Pirates – Director: Tetsuya Mariko
 Special Jury Prize
Be the World for Her – Director: Daisuke Hosaka

2006 Awards
Held February 23–27, 2006.
 Grand Prize
Blood Rain – Director: Kim Dae-seung
 Special Jury Prize
Never Belongs to Me – Director: Nam Ki-woong
 Minami Toshiko Award
Citizen Dog – Director: Wisit Sasanatieng

OFF THEATRE COMPETITION
 Grand Prize
Raw Summer (Nama-natsu) – Director: Keisuke Yoshida
 Special Jury Prize
Hakko – Director: Madoka Kumagai

2007 Awards
No awards - festival cancelled.

2008 Awards
Held March 19–23, 2008.

OFF THEATRE COMPETITION
 Grand Prize
 – Director: Tsuki Inoue
 Special Jury Prize
 – Director: Kouta Yoshida
 Governor's Award
 – Director: Kenji Itoso & Hiroshi Kamebuchi

2009 Awards
Held February 26-March 2, 2009.

OFF THEATRE COMPETITION
 Grand Prize
 – Director: Yū Irie
 Special Jury Prize
 – Director: Ōhata Hajime
 Governor's Award
 – Director: Choi Uian (チェ・ウィアン)

2010 Awards
Held February 25-March 1, 2010.

OFF THEATRE COMPETITION
 Grand Prize
 – Director: Yōsuke Okuda
 Special Jury Prize
 – Director: Tomoya Maeno
 Governor's Award
 – Director: ヒョン・スルウ
 Cinegar Award
 – Director: Tomoya Maeno

2011 Awards
Held February 24–28, 2011.

OFF THEATRE COMPETITION
 Grand Prize
Invasion of Alien Bikini (겨울냄새) – Director: Oh Young-Doo
 Special Jury Prize
 – Director: Kazuya Ogawa
 Governor's Award
 – Director: Takayuki Ishihara
 Cinegar Award
 – Director: Kazuya Ogawa

2012 Awards
Held February 23–27, 2012 with a total attendance at 12,500.

OFF THEATRE COMPETITION
 Grand Prize
 – Director: Takahiro Ishihara
 Special Jury Prize
 – Director: Taichi Suzuki
 Governor's Award
 – Director: Yuichiro Sakashita
 Cinegar Award
 – Director: Taichi Suzuki
 Best Actress
Nahana for 
 Best Actor
Hiroki Konno for 
 Audience Award
 - Director: Hideki Oka
 Event Award
Namba Kinyu-den Minami no Teio Toichi no Manda Ginjiro - Director: Takaaki Haginiwa
 Public Award

 Public People Award
 – Director: Taichi Suzuki

2013 Awards
Held February 21–25, 2013. Attendance was about 12,500.

OFF THEATRE COMPETITION
 Grand Prize
There Is Light - Director: Yukihiro Toda
 Special Jury Prize
A Case of Eggs - Director: Yuri Kanchiku
 Governor's Award
Winter Alpaca - Director: Yuji Harada
 Cinegar Award
There Is Light - Director: Yukihiro Toda

2014 Awards
Announced March 2, 2014

OFF THEATRE COMPETITION
 Grand Prize
The Pinkie - Director: Lisa Takeba
 Special Jury Prize
Gun Woman - Director: Mitsutake Kurando
 Governor's Award
School Girls' Gestation - Director: Ueda Atsushi
 Cinegar Award
The Pinkie - Director: Lisa Takeba
 Sky Perfect Movie Channel Award
Old Men Never Die - Director: Wang Cheol-min (South Korea)

2015 Awards
Announced on February 24, 2015

OFF THEATRE COMPETITION
 Grand Prize
Makeup Room - Director: Kei Morikawa
 Special Jury Prize
The Limit of Sleeping Beauty - Director: Ninomiya Ken
 Governor's Award
Haman - Director: Tetsuya Okabe
 Cinegar Award
Mizo - Director: Nam Ki Woong (South Korea)
 Sky Perfect Movie Channel Award
Luv ya Hun! - Director: Daigo Matsui

References

Sources

Fantasy and horror film festivals
Film festivals in Japan
Film organizations in Japan
Recurring events established in 1990
Festivals in Hokkaido
1990 establishments in Japan
Winter events in Japan
Yūbari, Hokkaido